R-Pharm is an international pharmaceutical company headquartered in Russia. It reached the headlines in 2020 following approval of its drug "Coronavir" as a treatment in cases of mild to moderate COVID-19 infection. It was founded by Alexey Repik (ru) in 2001, but has had an increasingly international operations base since, with Japanese Corporation Mitsui & Co., Ltd. acquiring 10% of its shares in 2017.

Activity
The company's scope of activities covers areas related to the development, research, production, marketing of drugs intended primarily for inpatient and specialized medical care. The main areas of activity are: production of finished dosage forms, active pharmaceutical ingredients of chemical nature and biotechnological substances, research and development of drugs and technologies, introduction to the Russian market of pharmaceuticals.

COVID-19
In 2020, during the COVID-19 outbreak in Russia, the company announced its intention to assist in the mass production of the Sputnik V COVID-19 vaccine developed by the Gamaleya Research Institute of Epidemiology and Microbiology. It also announced that it had received a license to manufacture the British Oxford–AstraZeneca COVID-19 vaccine. The company also manufactured the drug Coronavir, which has been described as the first prescription drug specifically developed against COVID-19 to reach the market. It was approved for use in hospitals in July 2020, and in September 2020 it received approval for prescription sales for outpatient use.

In December 2020, R-Pharm and the Gamaleya Research Institute of Epidemiology and Microbiology signed a Memorandum of Understanding with AstraZeneca to collaborate on the development of the COVID-19 vaccine and to conduct joint trials of the British and Russian vaccines.

See also
 COVID-19 pandemic in Russia

References

COVID-19 pandemic in Russia
Orphan drug companies
Vaccine producers
Medical research
Pharmaceutical companies of Russia